Mbomou can also refer to the Mbomou River.

Mbomou is one of the sixteen prefectures of the Central African Republic. The capital is Bangassou. Nearby are the Kembe Falls on the River Kotto. The prefecture is governed by Pierrette Benguere.

References

 
Prefectures of the Central African Republic